Borno State University is in Maiduguri, Borno State, Nigeria. It was established in 2016. It has five faculties with over 20 departments. The pioneer and current vice chancellor of the university is Prof. Umar Kyari Sandabe. In June 2021, the university's senate building was inaugurated by Muhammadu Buhari the current president of Nigeria.

Faculties
 Faculty of Sciences
 Faculty of Management 
 Faculty of Arts
 Faculty of Social Science
 Faculty of Education

Courses 
Courses offered in Borno State University include the following:

Accounting

Agriculture

Animal and environmental biology

Animal and environmental Biology

Biotechnology

Business Administration

Chemistry 

Computer science

Criminology and security studies

Economics 

Education and Biology

Education and Chemistry

Education and computer Science

Education and Economics

Education and English Language

Education and Islamic Studies

Education and Mathematics

Education and Physics

Educational Management

English Language

Geography

Guidance and Counselling

Islamic Studies

Literature in English

Mass Communication

Mathematics

Peace Studies and Conflict Resolution

Physics

Plant Science and Biotechnology

Political Science

Public administration

Sociology

Statistics

Teacher Education Science

References

External links
Borno State University official website

Universities and colleges in Nigeria
Educational institutions established in 2016
2016 establishments in Nigeria